Ruth Stuber Jeanne ( Stuber; b. 13 May 1910, Chicago; d. 6 Apr. 2004, Newark, Ohio) was an American marimbist, percussionist, violinist, and arranger.  On April 29, 1940, at Carnegie Hall, she and Orchestrette Classique, an all female orchestra, premiered the Concertino for Marimba and Orchestra by American composer Paul Creston, who was present. Creston wrote Concertino for Stuber and dedicated it to the orchestra's director, Frédérique Petrides (pronounced pe TREE dis), who asked Creston to compose it. The 1940 program note stated that Concertino was then "the only work ever written for this instrument in serious form." Jeanne was a tympanist with Orchestrette Classique.

Training 
Her father, Benjamin F. Stuber, taught strings in the Evanston (IL) public schools. Her early training was as violinist, and she played violin in the Evanston Symphony in high school and while studying at Northwestern University's School of Music in the early 1930s, being elected chair of the music students' social committee in fall 1931. In 1933, while living in Chicago, Stuber acquired her first marimba, and, in her words, "just took off!"  Clair Omar Musser (1901–98) was her first marimba teacher. She played in Musser’s 100-piece Marimba Orchestra for the 1933 World’s Fair in Chicago. By fall 1933 she lived in Florence, Alabama, where her father opened his Stuber School of Music. She was then performing widely around the region on both marimba and violin. Also, in Florence, she taught marimba and founded a marimba ensemble that performed both for live audiences and on WNRA radio. She taught music in Alabama's public schools, and also at the Women's College of Alabama in Montgomery, renamed Huntington College in 1935. In 1936, Stuber moved to New York City where she studied marimba with George Hamilton Green and timpani with George Braun, who would serve as percussionist (tympanist) with the Metropolitan Opera Orchestra from 1920 to 1954. Beginning in 1937, she taught band and orchestra in the Carle Place schools of Nassau County, NY.

Family 
In 1941, Ruth Stuber married Armand L. Jeanne (b. 14 June 1911, Cornol, Switzerland; d. 16 Sept. 16, 1968). Ruth and Armand had two sons.

Both Ruth and Armand are buried at Maple Grove Cemetery, Granville, Ohio.

References

External links
 Image of Ruth Stuber: LaBudde Special Collections Dept. | Paul Creston Collection: Photographs, University of Missouri, Kansas City
 Image of Creston Concertino manuscript, Percussive Notes (magazine), PAS
 Obituaries
 Jeanne, The Columbus Dispatch, April 21, 2004
 Jeanne, The Advocate (Newark, Ohio), April 10, 2004
 James Loyal Moore, PhD (Associate Professor of Music Emeritus at Ohio State University), Obituary: Ruth Stuber Jeanne, Percussive Notes (magazine), PAS (date of publication unknown)
 Ruth Stuber Jeanne, The Times-Recorder (Zanesville, Ohio) April 11, 2004

Northwestern University alumni
Bienen School of Music alumni
American percussionists
American music educators
American women music educators
Musicians from Ohio
1910 births
2004 deaths
People from Newark, Ohio
American marimbists
Women marimbists
20th-century American musicians
Educators from Ohio
20th-century American women musicians
21st-century American women